Pseudeustrotia is a genus of moths of the family Noctuidae. The genus was erected by William Warren in 1913.

Species
 Pseudeustrotia bipartita (Wileman, 1914)
 Pseudeustrotia candidula (Denis & Schiffermüller, 1775)
 Pseudeustrotia carneola (Guenée, 1852)
 Pseudeustrotia dimera (Hampson, 1910)
 Pseudeustrotia indeterminata (Barnes & McDunnough, 1918)
 Pseudeustrotia isomera (Hampson, 1910)
 Pseudeustrotia macrosema (Lower, 1903)
 Pseudeustrotia semialba (Hampson, 1894)

References

External links
 

Acontiinae
Taxa named by William Warren (entomologist)
Moth genera